The All India Senior School Certificate Examination (AISSCE) also called Class 12 Board Exams in common language, is the final examination conducted every year for high school students by the Central Board of Secondary Education on behalf of the Government of India.

Examination
Each subject in the examination is graded out of 100 marks. For subjects like Physics, Chemistry, Biology, Home Science, Mathematics, Geography, etc. for which practical exams are also conducted, 30/20 marks are reserved for practicals and internals and 70/80 marks for the theory exams. In 2020, even for non-science/lab-based subjects, CBSE issued guidelines to conduct internal assessment for 20 percent of the aggregate score, prior to which the theory exam was the sole basis of evaluation till 2019. The theory exams are conducted for a duration of 3 hours, while the duration for practical exams depends on the subject.

CBSE issued guidelines for the addition of practical marks to mathematics in March 2019. For practical exams, students have to perform practicals in other schools usually assigned by CBSE at random in the nearby state or area, maintain lab records and attend a viva voce. The CBSE gives a list of practical tasks to perform for students appearing for these practical exams.

Results
The results of the examinations are usually declared in the first week of May. In general, about 80% of candidates receive a passing score. The Delhi High Court has directed the Central Board of Secondary Education and Delhi University to discuss the ways by which the results of the main exam, revaluation, and compartment exam can be declared earlier than usual so that candidates do not miss the cut-off dates.

In 2021, due to the COVID-19 crisis, the secondary school exams for class X and XII had been cancelled.

References

External links
CBSE Website

Central Board of Secondary Education